National Bank of Commerce (NBC) is a full-service national bank based in Wisconsin, USA, with headquarters at 1127 Tower Ave., in downtown Superior, WI. The bank offers personal retail products and services, mortgage loans, business lending, credit and debit cards, online and mobile banking, and other financial services.  NBC is the largest locally-owned bank in the Twin Ports. The bank has been in the Wisconsin region since 1934.

NBC is the subsidiary of NATCOM Bancshares, Inc. NATCOM is a bank holding company primarily established in 1998 to manage the bank's assets.

Company History 
NBC was established in February of 1934 as the Union National Bank of Superior. The bank was insured by the Federal Deposit Insurance Corporation (FDIC) on April 23, 1934.

In 1940, the company was renamed as National Bank of Commerce.

In September 1972, National Bank of Commerce acquired Poplar State Bank of Solon Springs, Wisconsin.

In 1998, the bank reorganized its operations. The company also established NATCOM Bancshares Inc., as NBC's parent holding company.

In the year 2000, National Bank of Commerce opened its first location outside of Wisconsin, in Duluth, MN.

In June 2008, NBC purchased Superior Bancorp, with $90 million in assets and two branches in Superior. The deal gave the bank $540 million in assets and a 60 percent share of Douglas County, Wisconsin deposits. NBC also acquired Community Bank in November 2008.

In December 2017, NATCOM Bancshares, Inc., NBC's holding company, obtained federal permission to buy 49% of the voting shares of Republic Bank, owned by Republic Bancshares Inc. NBC subsequently received permission to purchase the remaining shares of Republic Bank in July 2019. The merger was completed in December 2019. Following the acquisition, NBC operated 12 branches throughout northeastern Minnesota and northwestern Wisconsin, including six branches previously owned by Republic Bank.

In 2022, NBC acquired the former City Hall building located at 1409 Hammond Ave, currently known as the Superior City Center. The additional space will be used for NBC's information technology (IT) offices, lending support services and other banking operations.

As of August 2022, NBC operates ten locations, with assets valued at $1.25 billion.

Bank Locations 
 National Bank of Commerce, Superior-Main Branch, 1127 Tower Ave, Superior, WI
 National Bank of Commerce, Midtown Branch, 2822 Tower Avenue, Superior, WI
 National Bank of Commerce, Poplar Branch, 4994 S Memorial Dr, Poplar WI
 National Bank of Commerce, Solon Springs, 9245 E Main St, Solon Springs, WI
 National Bank of Commerce, Downtown Branch, 306 West Superior Street, Duluth, MN
 National Bank of Commerce, Duluth Branch, 1314 East Superior Street, Duluth, MN
 National Bank of Commerce, Esko Branch, 3 Thomson Road, Esko, MN
 National Bank of Commerce, Hermantown Branch, 4105 Richard Avenue, Hermantown, MN
 National Bank of Commerce, Hibbing Branch, 2521 First Avenue, Hibbing, MN
 National Bank of Commerce, Woodland Branch, 1619 Woodland Avenue, Duluth, MN

Community Involvement 
In December 2013, NBC donated $400,000 to the Superior High School Board. In exchange, the school board gave the bank naming rights to the school's outdoor athletic complex. The complex was eventually named the NBC Spartan Sports Complex.

NBC has been a longtime partner of the University of Wisconsin-Superior and Yellowjacket Athletics. The bank sponsors the Yellowjacket men's basketball program's season-opening tournament.

In April 2022, NBC was recognized by the Entrepreneur Fund with the Community Catalyst Award. The award was presented at the Regional Economic Indicators Forum held on April 5.

The bank is also one of the largest known subscribers to Superior Water, Light & Power's community solar garden.

References

External links 
Official Website: https://www.nbcbanking.com/

Douglas County, Wisconsin
Banks based in Wisconsin
Banks established in 1934
1934 establishments in Wisconsin